Anagnota is a genus of flies of the family Anthomyzidae. Currently there are four described species that occur in the Palaearctic region:

 A. bicolor (Meigen, 1838) Western, North and Central Europe, Russia (Western Siberia)
 A. coccinea Roháček & Freidberg, 1993 Cyprus, Israel, Turkey
 A. major Roháček & Freidberg, 1993 Central Europe, Southeast Europe, North Africa
 A. oriens Roháček, 2006 Russia (Siberia)

References
 Jindřich Roháček and Amnon Freidberg. The Anthomyzidae (Diptera) of Israel, with revision of Anagnota Becker. Israel Journal of Entomology 27:61-112, ISSN 0075-1243

External links

Anthomyzidae
Opomyzoidea genera